The 2003 Nigerian Senate election in Bauchi State was held on April 12, 2003, to elect members of the Nigerian Senate to represent Bauchi State. Baba Tela representing Bauchi North, Bala Adamu representing Bauchi Central and Abubakar Maikafi representing Bauchi South all won on the platform of the Peoples Democratic Party.

Overview

Summary

Results

Bauchi North 
The election was won by Baba Tela of the Peoples Democratic Party.

Bauchi Central 
The election was won by Bala Adamu of the Peoples Democratic Party.

Bauchi South 
The election was won by Abubakar Maikafi of the Peoples Democratic Party.

References 

Bal
Bal
Bauchi State Senate elections